Iqbal Town is a large municipal administration area in Faisalabad city, Pakistan.

References

External links
 Faisalabad local govt system in disarray, October 2005

Tehsil municipal administrations of Faisalabad
Metropolitan areas of Pakistan